Aseptis torreyana is a moth of the family Noctuidae first described by Tomas Mustelin in 2006. It is found in along the south side of the sea level salt marsh estuary of the Torrey Pines State Reserve in southern California. The habitat is most likely salt marsh, although it could be coastal chaparral.

The wingspan is about 27.5 mm. The forewings are pale buff, overlaid with pale gray scales and marked with black basal dash and outlines of the three spots. The reniform spot is the largest and is filled with dark scales. The pale postmedial line is barely visible while the antemedial line is missing. The strong black basal dash gives the impression of a small pale Paraseptis adnixa. Adults are on wing in April.

References

Moths described in 2006
Aseptis
Moths of North America